Aureothin is a natural product of a cytotoxic shikimate-polyketide antibiotic with the molecular formula C22H23NO6. Aureothin is produced by the bacterium Streptomyces thioluteus that illustrates antitumor, antifungal, and insecticidal activities and the new aureothin derivatives can be antifungal and antiproliferative. In addition, aureothin, a nitro compound from Streptomyces thioluteus, was indicated to have pesticidal activity against the bean weevil by interfering with mitochondrial respiratory complex II.

Biosynthesis 
Regarding the biosynthesis of aureothin, the biosynthetic pathway would be begun with chorismic acid. P-nitrobenzoate is derived from p-aminobenzoate by an N-oxygenase, which is encoded by aurF. The aurF is one of the aureothin biosynthetic enzymes and it is referred to as a nonheme diiron oxygenase that is responsible for converting p-aminobenzoate to p-nitrobenzoate. Moreover, the aurF catalyzes a reaction of a complete six-electron oxidation utilizing two equivalents of dioxygen and two exogenous electrons in order to convert p-aminobenzoate to p-nitrobenzoate. Then, three type I Polyketide Synthases (PKSs), which is encoded by aurA, aurB, and aurC, generates the a polyketide chain using p-nitrobenzoate as a starter unit for the biosynthesis of aureothin. At this point, the repetition that one molecule catalyzes two successive cycles of chain extension would occur in the reaction of the type I Polyketide Synthase (PKS). In particular, the two consecutive cycles containing four times of methylmalonyl-CoA and one time of malonyl-CoA occur during the type I Polyketide Synthase (PKS). After O-methylation is activated by a methyltransferase, which is encoded by aurI, the tetrahydrofuran ring formation is produced by a monooxygenase that is encoded by aurH. Therefore, the final product, aureothin, is produced as a result of the monooxygenase encoded by aurH.

References

Further reading 

 
 

Polyketide antibiotics
Nitrobenzenes
Methoxy compounds
Tetrahydrofurans
4-Pyrones
Dienes